The Upper Engadine Cultural Archives is collecting of historical records and documents from Upper Engadine (Switzerland) and the neighbouring region. The Archives are housed in the Chesa Planta, a 16th century house in Samedan. The building and its library are a Swiss heritage sites of national significance.

Activities 
The goal of the Archives is to collect and conduct research on the cultural heritage of the Upper Engadine and the surrounding regions.  The organization makes its materials accessible to the public and addresses the arts, architecture, language, music, nature study, development of hotels, tourism, traffic and sport in the Engadine.

Since it was established in 1988, the Archives received or purchased more than 500 inheritances and gifts, consisting of posthumous productions, documentations and documents on art, architecture, language, music, natural history etc. Some of the most important available records are the family inheritance of the physicians Berry from St. Moritz, a collection of photographs by Gustav Sommer of Samedan, which includes over 40,000 negatives about the Engadine, 3,000 letters of the families Puonz, Curtin, Fonio from Sils – confectioners and ale brewers in Berlin, 420 Engadine photographs by Elizabeth Main (Elizabeth Hawkins-Whitshed), the inheritance of the architect Max Alioth of St. Moritz, drawings and sketches of the ornamental painter Kaspar Donatsch of Celerina, as well as the inheritance of Elvezia Michel, the artist from Borgonovo, Bregaglia.

Gallery 
Examples from the picture collection:

Bibliography

Publications about the Archives 
 Dora Lardelli: Das Kulturarchiv Oberengadin – eine Pionierinstitution, in: Bündner Jahrbuch, Chur 2016 
 Karl Wüst: Kulturarchiv Oberengadin in Samedan GR. „Bei Anfragen sage ich nie nein“, in: Da, wo etwas los ist. 15 Kulturorte in der Schweiz, Limmat Verlag, Zürich 2016
 Das Kulturarchiv Oberengadin feiert sein 25-Jahr-Jubiläum, in: Südostschweiz, 22. Juli 2013
 Gion Gaudenz und andere: 10 Jahre Kulturarchiv Oberengadin 1989–1999. Samedan 1999

Publications edited by the Archives 
 Das Engadin auf Glasplatten. Gustav Sommer 1882–1956. Hrsg. vom Kulturarchiv Oberengadin. Montabella Verlag, St. Moritz 2015 
 Dora Lardelli: The Magic Carpet. Kunstreise zu den Oberengadiner Hotels, 1850–1914. Hrsg. vom Kulturarchiv Oberengadin. Eine Publikation des Instituts für Kulturforschung Graubünden ikg, Chur. Verlag Skira, Mailand und Genf, 2010. Italienische und deutsche Ausgabe. 
 List of publications

References

External links 
  (in German)

Archives in Switzerland
History of Graubünden
Cultural property of national significance in Graubünden
Buildings and structures in Graubünden
Samedan